Senator Albright may refer to:

George W. Albright (1846–after 1937), Mississippi State Senate
Ray Albright (1934–2017), Tennessee State Senate